Finger Lickin' Good may refer to:

 "It's Finger Lickin' Good!", a slogan of KFC 
 Finger Lickin' Good, a 1967 album by Lonnie Smith
 Finger Lickin' Good, a 1975 album by Dennis Coffey
 "Finger Lickin' Good", a song by Beastie Boys from the 1992 album Check Your Head
 "Finger Lickin' Good", a song by Brecker Brothers from the 1977 album Don't Stop the Music (Brecker Brothers album)
 "Finger Lickin' Good", a song by Syl Johnson from the 1999 album Talkin' About Chicago
 "Finger Lickin' Good", a track on the 1973 album Giants of the Organ Come Together by Jimmy McGriff and Groove Holmes
 Finger Lickin Good, an Adelaide hip hop group of Quro with MC Madcap
 "Finger Lickin' Good", a 2020 episode of TV series 68 Whiskey

See also
 Finger Lickin' Fifteen
 Finger Lickin' Records